Robert Boone was an American Negro league pitcher between 1909 and 1912.

A native of Mississippi, Boone made his Negro leagues debut in 1909 with the San Antonio Black Bronchos. He went on to play for the Oklahoma Monarchs and Kansas City Royal Giants.

References

External links
Baseball statistics and player information from Baseball-Reference Black Baseball Stats and Seamheads

Date of birth missing
Year of death missing
Place of birth missing
Place of death missing
Kansas City Royal Giants players
Oklahoma Monarchs players
San Antonio Black Bronchos players
1884 births